A skeleton watch is a mechanical watch in which all of the moving parts are visible through either the front of the watch, the back of the watch or a small cut outlining the dial.

True 'skeletonization' also includes the trimming away of any non-essential metal on the bridge, plate, wheel train or any other mechanical part of the watch, leaving only a minimalist 'bare' skeleton of the movement required for functionality. Often, the remaining thinned movement is decorated with engraving. This can be with or without a dial face that allows the user to see through to the movement.

Designs also providing a glimpse of the movement but requiring less modification to the movement itself are the “semi-skeleton” design, with a partial cutaway of the watch face to view the workings of the movement underneath, and the “open heart” design, with a (usually circular) window to view the oscillation of the balance wheel, the “beating heart” of the watch. The “open heart” design is especially common on watches with a tourbillon complication, the better to show off what is regarded as an example of watchmaking virtuosity.

Some makers of mechanical skeleton watches and models include: 
 Akribos
 Armitron
 Breguet
 Chopard
 Corum
 Invicta watch
 Festina
 Fossil
 Kenneth Cole
 Oris
 Orient Watch / Orient Star Watch
 Patek Philippe & Co.
 Rougois
 Sea-Gull
 Seiko
 Stührling Original
 Swatch
 Tao International
 Tissot Le Locle

See also

 List of watch manufacturers

References

Watches